Voldemārs Vītols (27 January 1911 – 24 February 1980) was a Latvian middle-distance runner. He competed in the men's 3000 metres steeplechase at the 1936 Summer Olympics.

References

External links
 

1911 births
1980 deaths
Athletes (track and field) at the 1936 Summer Olympics
Latvian male middle-distance runners
Latvian male steeplechase runners
Olympic athletes of Latvia
Place of birth missing